Dr. Tihomir Kamenov is a Bulgarian jurist, the founder of the CL BioPharma Group.

Biographical details
Tihomir Kamenov was born on 7 October 1959 in Vratza, Bulgaria. He has an honours degree in Law from Sofia University and was a junior judge in the Sofia City Court.

He has also been Chief Legal Adviser, Botex; Lead Counsel in Bulgaria for Apple Computer and BP.

In 1991 he founded Commercial League National Pharma Center in Bulgaria and became General Manager of the Pharmaceutical League.

He has been a member of the board of the European Association of Pharmaceutical Wholesalers and Distributors and the European Association of Generic Medicine Manufacturers.

Dr. Kamenov is also a member of the Bulgarian Society of International Law.

Awards
Bulgarian Person of the Year 1999; Businessman of Bulgaria 2002; Charity Heart of Bulgaria 2002.

References

External links
CL BioPharma
World Economic Forum

Bulgarian judges
1959 births
Living people
People from Vratsa